Coleophora chiclanensis is a moth of the family Coleophoridae. It is found in Spain and on Sardinia.

The larvae feed on Crataegus monogyna. They create a brownish, three-valved, tubular leaf case with a mouth angle of about 60°. Larvae can be found up to April.

References

chiclanensis
Moths described in 1936
Moths of Europe